Colin O'Brien (born 17 April 1984) is a former Irish professional tennis player. He was born in Dublin, Ireland.

Career
O'Brien mainly played on the ITF Men's Circuit and also competed for the Ireland Davis Cup team where he held a 4–5 record. He retired at the end of the 2013 season.

Singles titles

Wins (0)

Runner-up (3)

Doubles titles

Wins (9)

Runner-up (15)

References

External links
 
 
 

1984 births
Living people
Irish male tennis players
Tennis players from Dublin (city)